Frank Chesterton may refer to:
 Frank Chesterton (badminton)
 Frank Chesterton (architect)